Doing His Thing is a 1969 studio album by Ray Charles, released by Tangerine Records. The cover artwork was by Lafayette Chew.

Critical reception 

Reviewing in his January 1970 "Consumer Guide" column, The Village Voice critic Robert Christgau wrote of Charles and the LP: "It's so easy to forget what a genius he still is. No balladeering here, no Beatle-mongering, nothing but hard-bopping Ray Charles soul. Yeah." In The Rolling Stone Album Guide (1992), J. D. Considine said it marked a return to Charles' funkier style of music with "an album that's long on groove but short on songs (although the interplay between Charles and Jimmy Lewis on 'If It Wasn't for Bad Luck' is delightful)".

Track listing
all songs written by Jimmy Lewis except as noted

Side A
 "The Same Thing That Can Make You Laugh (Can Make You Cry)" (Jimmy Lewis, Ray Charles) – 2:06
 "Finders Keepers, Losers Weepers" (Cliff Chambers, Jimmy Holiday, Jimmy Lewis) – 2:25
 "You Ought To Change Your Ways" – 2:45
 "Baby Please" – 3:35
 "Come and Get It" – 2:48

Side B
 "We Can Make It" – 3:43
 "I’m Ready" – 3:20
 "That Thing Called Love" – 2:54
 "If It Wasn’t For Bad Luck" (Jimmy Lewis, Ray Charles) – 4:45
 "I Told You So" – 4:11

Personnel
Ray Charles – keyboards, vocals
Jimmy Lewis – vocals

Notes / references
ABC 695
Doing His Thing at Allmusic.com

Ray Charles albums
1969 albums
ABC Records albums
Tangerine Records (1962) albums